Dirina cretacea is a species of saxicolous (rock-dwelling), crustose lichen in the family Roccellaceae. Its distribution is largely in the eastern Mediterranean, and in Andalusia, Spain. It was formally described as a new species in 1899 by Alexander Zahlbruckner as a member of the genus Chiodecton. The type specimen was collected in Croatia. Anders Tehler transferred it to the genus Dirina in 1983. The lichen has a whitish-grey thallus (0.3–1.0 mm thick) lacking soralia, and a chalk-like medulla. Ascospores measure 19–23 by 5–6 μm.

References

cretacea
Lichen species
Lichens described in 1899
Lichens of Southeastern Europe
Lichens of Southwestern Europe
Lichens of North Africa
Taxa named by Alexander Zahlbruckner